Echioceras is an extinct genus of ammonites from the Early Jurassic of Europe and North America.

Description
Shell of Echioceras species can reach a diameter of about .. The narrow and broad evolute shell is reinforced by fine ribs on inner whorls, progressively becoming stronger, straight and distinct.

Distribution
Fossils of species within this genus have been found in the Jurassic rocks of Canada, Hong Kong, Turkey and United Kingdom, Carpathians and Alps.

References
Notes

Bibliography
Cyril Walker & David Ward (1993) - Fossielen: Sesam Natuur Handboeken, Bosch & Keuning, Baarn. 

Psiloceratoidea
Ammonitida genera
Early Jurassic ammonites of Europe
Early Jurassic ammonites of North America
Early Jurassic ammonites of Asia
Sinemurian life